Joaquín Canaves (8 January 1640 – 3 June 1721) was a Spanish prelate who served as the Bishop of Malta from 1713 till 1721.

Biography
Canaves was born in Pollença, Majorca in Spain. On 24 February 1679	he was ordained priest of the Sovereign Military Order of Malta. On 30 August 1713 Pope Clement XI appointed him as the successor of Bishop Davide Cocco Palmieri of Malta. He was consecrated bishop by Cardinal Francesco Acquaviva on 10 September and formally installed on 4 October the same year. He spent the remaining 7 years as bishop of Malta until 3 June 1721, when he died at the age of 81.

See also
Catholic Church in Malta

References

1640 births
1721 deaths
People from Mallorca
Knights of Malta
Spanish Roman Catholic bishops
Knights Hospitaller bishops
18th-century Roman Catholic bishops in Malta
Bishops of Malta